"Adem in, adem uit" is a single by Dutch three-piece girl group Lisa, Amy & Shelley. The song was released in the Netherlands as a digital download in October 2007. It was released as the lead single from their debut studio album 300% (2008). The song peaked at number 55 on the Dutch Singles Chart. The song was chosen to represent the Netherlands at the 2007 Junior Eurovision Song Contest. The song received 39 points, placing 11th of the 17 competing countries.

Track listing

Chart performance

Weekly charts

Release history

References

2007 songs
2007 singles
O'G3NE songs
Junior Eurovision songs